Neptunium(IV) fluoride or neptunium tetrafluoride is a inorganic compound with the formula NpF4. It is a green salt and is isostructural with UF4.

Synthesis

Neptunium(IV) fluoride can be prepared by reacting neptunium(III) fluoride or neptunium dioxide with a gas mixture of oxygen and hydrogen fluoride at 500 °C:

It can also be prepared by treating neptunium dioxide with HF gas:

References

Neptunium compounds
Fluorides
Actinide halides